Lev Moiseievich Bienstok (6 April 1836 – 22 October 1894) was a Russian writer, educationist, and communal worker.

Biography

Early life and education
Bienstok was born to Moshe Avraham Bienstok in Lukachi, Volhynian Governorate. He received his first education in the ḥeder and in the Russian public school at Turin, district of Kovel. He was a childhood friend of Sholem Yankev Abramovich, with whom he would later collaborate on a number of literary projects.

He was appointed teacher at the Jewish school of Starokostiantyniv, and acted as rabbi of the Zhitomir community from 1859 to 1862. From 1863 to 1867 he was instructor in the Jewish religion at various gymnasia in Zhitomir.

Career
In 1867 Bienstok was appointed assistant editor of the Volynskiya Gubernskiya Vyedomosty, the official newspaper of the government of Volhynia, and from 1867 to 1882 was adviser on Jewish matters (uchony yevrei) to the governor of Volhynia. In 1880 Bienstok settled at St. Petersburg as secretary of the Jewish community there; but after the anti-Jewish riots he returned to Zhitomir, and in 1892 the Russian-Jewish Aid Society for Agriculturists and Artisans of Odessa appointed him as its representative in Jaffa. There he brought order into the affairs of the society, and reported on the condition of the Jewish agricultural settlements of Palestine.

Bienstok was one of the pioneer collaborators of the first Russian-Jewish periodicals,  and Sion. He also contributed to the Russian periodicals Moskovskiya Vyedomosti, Russki Vyestnik, and others.

Publications

Bienstok was the author of Otzy i Dyety ('Fathers and Sons'), a translation of Abramovich's Hebrew novel Avot u-banim, and Yevreiskiya Zemledyelcheskiya Kolonii Yekaterinoslavskoi Gubernii (St. Petersburg, 1890), on the Jewish agricultural colonies of the Yekaterinoslav Governorate.

References
 

1836 births
1894 deaths
19th-century rabbis from the Russian Empire
19th-century educators from the Russian Empire
19th-century male writers from the Russian Empire
Jewish writers from the Russian Empire
Male writers from the Russian Empire
Volhynian Jews
Zionists from the Russian Empire